Rapid București i is a Romanian professional football club based in Bucharest, whose team has regularly taken part in Union of European Football Associations (UEFA) competitions. Qualification for Romanian clubs is determined by a team's performance in its domestic league and cup competitions. Steaua have regularly qualified for the primary European competition, the European Cup, by winning the Liga I. Rapid have also achieved European qualification via the Cupa României and have played in both the former UEFA Cup Winners' Cup and the UEFA Cup (now called the UEFA Europa League).

European competitions 
The first continental competition organised by UEFA was the European Cup in 1955. It is the most prestigious European competition and was conceived by the editor of L'Équipe Gabriel Hanot, as a competition for winners of the European national football leagues. The format of the competition was changed for the 1992–93 season to include a group stage instead of the straight knockout format previously in use. The competition was also renamed as the UEFA Champions League. Further changes were made for the 1997–98 season, with the runners-up from countries placed highly in the UEFA coefficients allowed to enter. This was later expanded to four team for the top countries in the coefficients.

A number of other European competitions have also taken place. The secondary cup competition is the UEFA Cup, which was established in 1972. The competition was initially open to teams who finished as runners-up in their respective national leagues. This was later expanded based on the countries rank in the coefficients and performance in domestic cup competitions. The competition was renamed as the UEFA Europa League for the 2009–10 season. The UEFA Cup Winners' Cup was a competition for the winners of all European domestic cup competitions. Established in 1960 it was considered the secondary cup competitions until the re-branding of the European Cup, which weakened the competition and it was considered the weakest of the three competitions. The competition was discontinued in 1999 and amalgamated into the UEFA Cup.

The UEFA Super Cup is a competition between the winners of the Champions League and Europa League. It was contested between the winners of the Champions League and Cup Winners' Cup up until the discontinuation of the latter in 1999. The competition was originally held over two-legs but was changed to a single match in 1998. The Inter-Cities Fairs Cup was established in 1955 and run independently of UEFA. It was initially for team from cities that hosted trade fairs, it was later expanded to include runners-up from the domestic leagues. In 1971, it came under the control of UEFA and was re-branded as the UEFA Cup. Established in 1960 the Intercontinental Cup was a competition for the winners of the European Cup and the South American equivalent the Copa Libertadores. Jointly organised by UEFA and the Confederación Sudamericana de Fútbol (CONMEBOL) it was contested until 2004, when it was replaced by the FIFA Club World Cup which included the winners of all six confederations regional championships.

Total statistics 

Including home match with Heerenveen.

Statistics by country 

Including home match with Heerenveen.

Statistics by competition 

Notes for the abbreviations in the tables below:

 QR: Qualifying round
 PR: Preliminary round
 1R: First round
 2R: Second round
 3R: Third round
 QF: Quarter-finals
 1QR: First qualifying round
 2QR: Second qualifying round
 3QR: Third qualifying round
 PO: Play-off round
 R32: Round of 32
 R16: Round of 16

UEFA Champions League / European Cup

UEFA Europa League / UEFA Cup

UEFA Cup Winners' Cup / European Cup Winners' Cup

UEFA Intertoto Cup

External links
  Official website

FC Rapid București
Romanian football clubs in international competitions